Peace Bridge Arena  was the main sports arena located in Fort Erie, Ontario.  Built in 1928, it held 5,000 people.  It was located near the Peace Bridge connecting Fort Erie with Buffalo, New York.  Both the Chicago Black Hawks and Pittsburgh Pirates made the arena a temporary home for the first few games during the 1928–29 NHL season.  

The arena was also the home of the Buffalo Bisons ice hockey team; for a brief period in 1931, it also served as the backup arena for their crosstown rivals, the Buffalo Majors, who normally played at Broadway Auditorium.  On March 17, 1936, the roof collapsed after thirteen inches of heavy snowfall, which ensured the original hockey Bisons' demise.

Eventually, in 1940, Buffalo Memorial Auditorium, on the American side of the border, would open, replacing both Broadway Auditorium and Peace Bridge Arena; with it, a new Bisons team would be established.

External links
 Peace Bridge Arena information

Defunct indoor arenas in Canada
Defunct indoor ice hockey venues in Canada
Sports venues in Ontario
1928 establishments in Ontario
Sports venues completed in 1928